The Tenth National Bank was an American bank that existed in the 19th Century.  At one time, financier Jay Gould acquired a controlling interest in the bank, and New York's William M. Tweed ("Boss Tweed") was one of its directors.  The Tenth National Bank was also "Gould's primary vehicle to finance his move to establish a gold corner," leading up to Black Friday (1869).

The Bank failed in the 1870s.

References

Bank failures in the United States
Economic history of the United States
Companies disestablished in the 1870s